Aluminium 7116 alloy is heat treatable wrought alloy. It has 4.2 to 5.2 weight percentage of Zinc. It also contains magnesium, copper as small additions.

Chemical composition

Properties

Applications 
Its application is in the aviation industry

References

External links
 https://www.researchgate.net/publication/238402678_Machinability_of_7116_Structural_Aluminum_Alloy
 https://www.tandfonline.com/doi/abs/10.1080/AMP-200060603
 https://www.tandfonline.com/doi/full/10.1080/AMP-200060603?scroll=top&needAccess=true

Aluminium–zinc alloys